Howard Leonard Heggedal (born September 15, 1949) is a Canadian former professional ice hockey player. During the 1972–73 season, Heggedal played eight games in the World Hockey Association with the Los Angeles Sharks.

References

External links

1949 births
Canadian ice hockey forwards
Denver Spurs players
Greensboro Generals (EHL) players
Greensboro Generals (SHL) players
Ice hockey people from Alberta
Living people
Los Angeles Sharks players
Philadelphia Firebirds (NAHL) players
Sportspeople from Lethbridge
Toledo Hornets players